Oliver Walker (born 23 September 1985) is a British actor, known for his role on the TV series Atlantis. He has also made guest appearances on Doctors, Holby City and Coronation Street, among others.

Career
In 2013, Walker was a key cast member of the fantasy show Atlantis aired on BBC One based on Greek myth and the mythological city Atlantis. He played Heptarian, one of the series' antagonists, who plots along with the main villain, Pasiphaë.

Filmography

Awards
Walker was awarded the Em-Lou Production and Drill Hall Award and the Micheal Mac Liammoir Award for Best Actor at the International Dublin Gay Theatre Festival in 2011.

Personal life
Walker is from Plymouth and currently lives in London. He previously studied at Arts Educational Schools London before becoming an actor.

References

External links

1985 births
21st-century English male actors
English male television actors
Living people
People educated at the Arts Educational Schools